Yusuf Datti Baba-Ahmed  (born 7 July 1969) is a Nigerian economist and politician who served as Senator for Kaduna North from 2011 to 2012 and member of the House of Representatives from 2003 to 2007. A member of the Labour Party, he is the party's vice presidential nominee in the 2023 presidential election running alongside Peter Obi.

From the prominent Baba-Ahmed family of Zaria, Baba-Ahmed graduated from the University of Maiduguri. After schooling, he worked in business and banking for several years before entering politics. Baba-Ahmed was elected as House of Representatives member for Zaria in 2003; while in the position, he became known for speaking out against corruption and the Third Term Agenda. After leaving office in 2007, Baba-Ahmed continued advocating for good governance while returning to his Baze business grouping and founding Baze University. By 2011, he moved back to politics and successfully ran for Senator for Kaduna North; however, the electoral tribunal overturned his victory and he left office in 2012. After an unsuccessful presidential campaign in the 2019 PDP primary, Baba-Ahmed joined the Labour Party in 2022 to become Peter Obi's running mate.

Early life and education 
Yusuf Datti Baba-Ahmed was born to the Baba-Ahmed family in Zaria in 1969. He is among the thirty-three children of his father, Baba Ahmed, who was an Arab cattle-trader from modern-day Mauritania who later became a notable scholar and expert on Islamic jurisprudence.

Baba-Ahmed has a BSc and MSc in Economics from the University of Maiduguri in Borno State. He worked in the security Printing and Minting, Lagos before entering politics.

In 2006, while a Federal representative, he earned the title of Doctor of Philosophy when he completed his PhD studies at the University of Westminster.

Political career
Baba-Ahmed was elected in April 2003 to the Federal House of Representatives for the Zaria Federal Constituency, Kaduna State. He ran on the All Nigeria People's Party (ANPP) platform.

Baba-Ahmed was popular for his principled activism. During the administration of President Olusegun Obasanjo, he was among lawmakers who opposed letting Obasanjo run for a third term. In May 2006 he said he would not run for reelection unless action was taken to investigate allegations that members had been bribed to support the constitutional changes needed for a third term presidency. In 2007 he took the Independent National Electoral Commission to court over conduct of past elections. Baba-Ahmed contested and won the Kaduna North Senatorial elections in 2011 under Congress for Progressive Change (CPC) which was then led by President Muhammadu Buhari; the election was challenged at the court by the candidate of the Peoples Democratic Party (PDP)  which led to Ahmed’s controversial victory being upturned.
In 2018, he ran unsuccessfully for the Presidential ticket of the Peoples Democratic Party (PDP). In 2022, he pulled out as  a gubernatorial aspirant in the Peoples Democratic Party (PDP) primaries for the 2023 governorship elections in Kaduna State, citing his refusal to buy delegate votes as his reason. On 8 July 2022, he was nominated as the Vice Presidential candidate  of the Labour Party in the 2023 Nigeria General election.

Later career
Speaking at an Islamic media forum in Abuja in September 2008, Baba-Ahmed called on journalists to fearlessly submit accurate reports. He said that corruption in the country is endemic, and special prayers and determination from all stakeholders are needed to correct the situation.
Baba-Ahmed became the Managing Director of Baze Research and Data Services Ltd.

Baba-Ahmed was founder and Pro–Chancellor of Baze University, an independent university located in Abuja in the Federal Capital Territory, Nigeria which was allegedly said to be the most expensive university in Nigeria opened in April 2011. Citing his studies abroad as a benchmark, he said that the Nigerian educational system was "appalling" and that this inspired him to start Baze University.

References

1969 births
Living people
Nigerian Muslims
People from Zaria
Nigerian politicians
Nigerian economists
University of Maiduguri alumni
University of Westminster
Nigerian people of Arab descent